Aquiloeurycea scandens, commonly known as the Tamaulipan false brook salamander, is a species of salamander in the family Plethodontidae. It is endemic to Mexico and known from the El Cielo Biosphere Reserve in southern Tamaulipas. There are also reports from San Luis Potosí and Coahuila, but these may well refer to other, as yet unnamed species.

Its natural habitat is caves. Within the El Cielo Biosphere Reserve its habitat is well protected. It was once fairly common, but has not been seen after mid-1980s. Whether this reflects a genuine decline or low survey effort is not known.

References

scandens
Fauna of the Sierra Madre Oriental
Endemic amphibians of Mexico
Amphibians described in 1955
Taxonomy articles created by Polbot